William Frith (9 June 1912 – 1996) was an English football player and manager.

Starting his career with Worksop Town, Mansfield Town, and Chesterfield; he won a move to Coventry City in 1932. He stayed with the club right up until the outbreak of World War II, helping the club to finish 1935–36 as Third Division South champions, and played a total of 165 games for the club in the Football League.

In 1945 he was appointed as manager of Port Vale, before he returned to Coventry as manager in 1947. His time at both clubs was unsuccessful, and he spent the next decade in non-league football as manager of Stafford Rangers and Rugby Town. He returned to Coventry as manager in 1957 and led the club to promotion out of the Fourth Division in 1958–59, but was sacked in 1961. His last management post was at Chelmsford City between 1963 and 1965, he led the club to second in the Southern League in 1963–64.

Playing career
Frith played as a wing half for non-league sides Worksop Town and Mansfield Town. He transferred to Second Division side Chesterfield in 1931, and scored on his debut in the Football League on 19 September, in a 3–2 win over Bradford (Park Avenue). He scored a total of three goals in nine league games, before he moved on to Coventry City later in the year. He remained in Harry Storer's team up until the outbreak of World War II. During this time Coventry finished second in the Third Division South in 1933–34, though were not promoted. They did achieve promotion at the end of the 1935–36 campaign, after topping the division, one point ahead of chasers Luton Town. Coventry finished in fourth place in the Second Division in the two pre-war seasons, missing out on promotion to the First Division by one point in 1937–38 and four points in 1938–39. Frith made a total of 172 League appearances for Coventry City in two spells.

Managerial career

Port Vale
Frith was appointed manager of Port Vale in August 1945. The 1945–46 season was uneventful and he seemed to settle into management quite well. In preparation for the first season of post-war football, he signed experienced forward Colin Lyman from Tottenham Hotspur for 'fairly substantial fee', full-back Garth Butler from Derby County, and half-back Norman Hallam from Chelsea. He sold goalkeeper Arthur Jepson to Stoke City for £3,750. However, after a poor start to the season, he resigned in October 1946 over a policy difference with the club's directors. He claimed the board refused to back his suggestions for new players, interfered in team selection and failed to grant him a three-year contract – claims which the club denied. The "Valiants" went on to finish the 1946–47 campaign in tenth place in the Third Division South under Gordon Hodgson.

Coventry City
After leaving Port Vale, Frith returned to Highfield Road as assistant to Dick Bayliss, and also played seven league games. Following Bayliss' death, Frith was appointed as manager of Coventry City in August 1947, remaining in that position until November 1948. He signed goalkeeper Reg Matthews but was sacked with the club in the bottom two. Coventry finished the 1947–48 Second Division season in tenth place, and went on to end the 1948–49 season just two points above the relegation zone under Harry Storer's stewardship.

Following spells in charge at non-league clubs Stafford Rangers and Rugby Town, he rejoined Coventry City as a coach and was once again appointed manager in September 1957. His side ended 1957–58 in nineteenth place in the Third Division South, and so were invited to become founder members of the Fourth Division in 1958–59. He then took the club to a second-place finish in 1958–59, four points behind champions Port Vale, his former club; City were therefore promoted into the Third Division.

His side flirted with the prospect of a second successive promotion in 1959–60, but ultimately finished in fifth place. They failed to push for promotion in 1960–61, and ended the campaign in fifteenth place. On what was known as 'Black Saturday', 25 November 1961, Coventry were dumped out of the FA Cup by non-league King's Lynn, and Frith was sacked by chairman Derrick Robins. He was replaced by Jimmy Hill, who took Coventry to a fourteenth-place finish in 1961–62. He later managed Chelmsford City, and led the "Clarets" to second and fifth-place finishes in the Southern League in 1963–64 and 1964–65. He later worked as a teacher until retiring in 1977.

Career statistics

Playing statistics
Source:

A.  The "Other" column constitutes appearances and goals in the League Cup, Football League Trophy, Football League play-offs and Full Members Cup.

Managerial statistics
Source:

Honours
Coventry City
Football League Third Division South: 1935–36
Football League Fourth Division second-place promotion: 1958–59

References

1912 births
1996 deaths
Footballers from Sheffield
Association football wing halves
English footballers
Worksop Town F.C. players
Mansfield Town F.C. players
Chesterfield F.C. players
Coventry City F.C. players
Port Vale F.C. players
English Football League players
English football managers
Port Vale F.C. managers
Coventry City F.C. managers
Stafford Rangers F.C. managers
Chelmsford City F.C. managers
English Football League managers
Southern Football League managers
Association football coaches
English schoolteachers